Marianne Carlström (born 1946) is a Swedish Social Democratic Party politician.  She served as a member of the Riksdag from the constituency Göteborgs kommun from 1987 to 2006.

References

1946 births
Living people
Members of the Riksdag from the Social Democrats
Women members of the Riksdag
Members of the Riksdag 1994–1998
Members of the Riksdag 1998–2002
Members of the Riksdag 2002–2006
21st-century Swedish women politicians
20th-century Swedish women politicians
20th-century Swedish politicians